"Alcohol-Free" is a song recorded by South Korean girl group Twice. It was released on June 9, 2021, through JYP Entertainment and Republic Records. It serves as the lead single from the group's tenth extended play, Taste of Love, which was released two days after.

Background and release 
On April 19, 2021, it was reported that Twice were in the final stages of preparing for their comeback slated for June and had plans of filming a music video on Jeju Island. The group revealed the track listing to the EP, revealing "Alcohol-Free" as the lead single. On June 7 and 8, the music video teasers for its accompanying video were published. "Alcohol-Free" was released for digital download and streaming on June 9 with an accompanying music video that was released simultaneously.

Composition 
Written by J. Y. Park, "Alcohol-Free" is a bossa nova summer track with some hip hop elements, expressing Twice's "unique colors". Chaeyoung and Jihyo said that it reminded them of the group's earlier summer song, "Dance the Night Away". Lyrically, the song recounts the magical moments of falling in love, with references to alcoholic drinks and cocktails. Running for 3 minutes and 30 seconds, the song is composed in the key of G♯ major with a tempo of 97 beats per minute.

Commercial performance 
"Alcohol-Free" peaked at number 41 on the Billboard Global 200 and spent 8 weeks on the chart. In Japan, the song peaked at number 19 on the Billboard Japan Hot 100. In South Korea, it peaked at number 6 on the Gaon Digital Chart and at number 7 on the K-pop Hot 100.

Promotion 
Twice performed "Alcohol-Free" on The Ellen DeGeneres Show on the day of its release, June 9.

Japanese version 
Twice released the fourth compilation album #Twice4,  on March 16, 2022,  which includes both Korean and Japanese-language versions of "Alcohol-Free" The Japanese lyrics were written by Yuki Kokobo.

Accolades

Charts

Weekly charts

Monthly charts

Year-end charts

Certifications 

! scope="col" colspan="3" | Streaming
|-

See also 
 List of Inkigayo Chart winners (2021)
 List of M Countdown Chart winners (2021)

References 

2021 singles
2021 songs
Korean-language songs
Songs written by Park Jin-young
Twice (group) songs